John William Grieve (6 October 1879 – 11 May 1942) was an  Australian rules footballer who played with St Kilda in the Victorian Football League (VFL).

References

External links 

1879 births
1942 deaths
Australian rules footballers from Melbourne
St Kilda Football Club players
People from Carlton, Victoria